Ercito "Chito" Victolero (born November 29, 1975) is a Filipino professional basketball coach and former player. He is the head coach for the Magnolia Hotshots of the Philippine Basketball Association (PBA).

He played in the PBA for the Sta. Lucia Realtors where he was drafted by the Realtors in the second round of the 2002 PBA draft as the 13th overall pick.

Early years
Victolero first played high school ball for the Sacred Heart Academy in Bulacan and later became a member of the Region III squad in the PRISAA. From there, he made it to the varsity squad and joined the Mapua Cardinals under coach Joel Banal in 1992, a year after MIT had completed back-to-back title conquests in the senior division of the NCAA.

He played in his first commercial ballclub in 1995 with the Stag Pale Pilsen in the Philippine Basketball League under coach Alfrancis Chua and was a member of the Pilseners that won the historic grandslam in the PBL.

Professional career
After playing college basketball for Mapúa, Victorelo applied for the 2002 PBA draft where he was drafted thirteenth overall by the Sta. Lucia Realtors.

Before the 2005 Fiesta Conference, Victolero was signed by the FedEx Express where he played for one conference.

Coaching career
On April 2009, Victolero was hired by his alma mater, Mapúa, to be the head coach of the university's team, the Mapúa Cardinals. However, Victorelo resigned from his post as head coach. According to a source, the Mapúa school administration was on the verge of firing Victolero because of the team's poor performances in the NCAA. The school administration also elected not to renew Victorelo's expiring contract, but Victolero left his post before the school administration could inform him in a scheduled meeting.

Before the 2014–15 PBA season, Victolero was hired by the Kia Sorento to be one of the team's assistant coaches. Kia Head coach Manny Pacquiao credited Victolero as one of the reasons for Kia's inspiring run for the franchise's first season.

Before the 2016–17 PBA season, Victolero was hired by Star Hotshots to be their head coach.

Coaching record

Collegiate record

References

1975 births
Living people
Barako Bull Energy players
Basketball players from Bulacan
Filipino men's basketball coaches
Filipino men's basketball players
Mapúa Cardinals basketball players
People from Santa Maria, Bulacan
Point guards
Sta. Lucia Realtors players
Terrafirma Dyip coaches
San Juan Knights players
Sta. Lucia Realtors draft picks
Magnolia Hotshots coaches
Mapúa Cardinals basketball coaches